Jack Crabtree is a contemporary English figurative painter and teacher. He is known for a series of paintings documenting the South Wales coal industry.

Early life and education
Crabtree was born in 1938 in Rochdale, Lancashire, England. He studied at the following art colleges:
Rochdale College of Art 
Saint Martin's School of Art, London (1957–59)
Royal Academy Schools, London (1959–61)

Career
After leaving the Royal Academy, Crabtree lived and worked for a number of years in Rochdale and Salford and then at Newport in South Wales, before taking up an appointment at the University of Ulster in Belfast. He settled in France in 1987.

He was elected a member of the 56 Group Wales (1971–75).

To date Crabtree has had over 70 solo exhibitions. His work can be found in many public collections.

Style
Crabtree's style was described in 1978 by Margaret Richards of Tribune:
"Crabtree is a social realist who works in a natural style that is neither didactic nor over-emphatic. Sometimes his imagery is exhilarating, full of energetic figures, and sometimes sad and sensitive, showing old or weary men struggling to keep going. His vision is affectionate rather than romantic. He sees wild hillsides as a beautiful setting for one of the grimmest jobs facing any man. In his paintings, that beauty and that grimness are parts of an inter-locking reality that has stimulated his creative imagination; while in his graphics the spare outlines and meticulous observation of human nature has been likened to George Grosz's. The comparison is misleading, for Crabtree's sense of humour rarely turns into satire."

Teaching
1961–66: Salford School of Art, and teaching in schools in the Salford and Rochdale area.

1966–74: Lecturer at the College of Art in Newport.

1978- : Senior Lecturer at the Gwent College of Further Education

1983–86: Professor and Head of Fine Art at the University of Ulster, Belfast.

Public collections
Crabree's work is in several public collections, including:
Arts Council of Ireland
Arts Council of Northern Ireland
Glynn Vivian Art Gallery Swansea
Grundy Art Gallery, Blackpool
National Coal Mining Museum for England, Wakefield
National Library of Wales
National Museum Cardiff
National Trust 
Newport Museum and Art Gallery
Ulster Museum
University of South Wales (Glamorgan)

Awards
1959/60: Kenyon's Foundation Rochdale Education Authority travelling bursary to France.

1974/75: Fellowship at the National Coal Board.

1975/76: Gregynog Arts Fellowship, University of Wales.

1977/78: First International Ruhr Arts Fellowship awarded by the West German Government.

Notable commissions
1971: Artist at Work  - murals on the theme of Owain Glyndŵr for the Council Chambers at Plas, Machynlleth.

1974/75: for the National Coal Board, a pictorial record of the changing face of the coalfields of South Wales.

1992/93: Commissioned by the National Trust to record Patterson's Spade Mill, Northern Ireland, pre-restoration.

References

External links

 "Portrait of Francis Stuart (1990)" at Arts Council of Northern Ireland
 "In the Showers" at Gathering the Jewels.org
  

20th-century English painters
English male painters
21st-century English painters
Modern painters
Alumni of Saint Martin's School of Art
Alumni of the Royal Academy Schools
Academics of Ulster University
1938 births
People from Newport, Wales
People from Rochdale
People from Salford
Living people
Members of the 56 Group Wales
20th-century English male artists
21st-century English male artists